Edson "Karr" Cruz (born 4 February 1988) is a Cape Verdean international football midfielder who played for Cypriot side Aris Limassol.

Career
Edson Cruz played in the youth teams of F.C. Porto until 2007, when initiated his senior career by being loaned to F.C. Infesta in the Portuguese Second Division during the 2007-08season. Next year he was loaned to a more ambitious S.C. Olhanense that finished their campaign that season as champions of 2008–09 Liga de Honra and thus promoted to the Primeira Liga.

However, expired the loan deal, Edson Cruz returned to F.C. Porto which sold him to Gondomar S.C. where he played the 2009-10 season in the Second Division, however in summer 2010 he was back to the Liga de Honra by signing with newly promoted C.D. Fátima.

In summer 2011 he moved to G.D. Interclube, commonly known as Inter Luanda, playing in the Girabola, Angolan top tier.

In December 2011 he came for a trial at Serbian SuperLiga side FK Radnički 1923.

National team
He has been part of the Cape Verde national football team since 2008, when he became part of the team in the qualification matches for the 2010 African Nations Cup.

References

1988 births
Living people
Cape Verdean footballers
Cape Verde international footballers
Cape Verdean expatriate footballers
Association football midfielders
S.C. Olhanense players
Gondomar S.C. players
C.D. Trofense players
Liga Portugal 2 players
Expatriate footballers in Portugal
G.D. Interclube players
Expatriate footballers in Angola
Aris Limassol FC players
Expatriate footballers in Cyprus
C.D. Fátima players
Cypriot First Division players